The Transfiguration of the Lord Church It is a Catholic church in Tver, belonging to the Archdiocese of the Mother of God in Moscow in the Russian Federation, built between 1994 and 2002.

The Catholic parish of Tver existed since the early nineteenth century. In 1864, a larger room with bodies, a presbytery and a church was built vast library. The church was confiscated in 1920 and disjointed library. Secularized, the church was demolished in 1974.

In the 1990s, the parish was again officially registered and a new church consecrated by Archbishop Tadeusz Kondrusiewicz in 2003.

See also
Roman Catholicism in Russia
Transfiguration of the Lord

References

Roman Catholic churches in Russia
Buildings and structures in Tver
Roman Catholic churches completed in 2002